USS Essex (LHD-2) is a  Landing Helicopter Dock (LHD) in service with the United States Navy. The amphibious assault ship was built at what is now Huntington Ingalls Industries in Pascagoula, Mississippi. She was launched 23 February 1991 and commissioned on 17 October 1992 while moored at Naval Air Station (NAS) North Island. She is the fifth ship named for Essex County, Massachusetts.

History

1990s

1993
Essex conducted a training program during the spring of 1993, and from 18 August until 23 November, was undergoing upgrades, during Post Shakedown Availability, in Long Beach harbor.

1994
Essexs maiden deployment was in October 1994. With the 13th Marine Expeditionary Unit (MEU) (Special Operations Capable (SOC)) embarked. In January 1995, she left the Persian Gulf to prepare for the complex task of covering the withdrawal of United Nations multinational force from Somalia in Operation United Shield. Under fire from advancing Somalis, every member of the force was successfully extracted. Essex returned to San Diego on 25 April 1995.

1996
After a short maintenance period, Essex embarked on a vigorous workup cycle, culminating in her participation in Rim of the Pacific Exercise (RIMPAC), a biennial, seven-nation naval exercise. On 10 October 1996, she embarked on her second Western Pacific deployment with the 11th MEU (SOC) and Amphibious Squadron Five. During the deployment, Essex participated in multinational exercises with Qatar, Oman, and Kuwait, as well as Exercise Tandem Thrust 1997, an American-Australian combined exercise with over 28,000 troops, 250 aircraft, and 40 ships participating.

1997
On her return in April 1997, Essex went into a short maintenance period, followed by a shortened workup cycle. She then departed for her third Western Pacific, Indian Ocean, and the Persian Gulf deployment on 21 June 1998 with the 15th MEU (SOC) and Amphibious Squadron Five. Essex participated in Exercises Sea Soldier and Red Reef and Military SALT and Non-Combatant Evacuation Operations with the U.S. Embassy in Kuwait. Additionally, Essex supported Operation Southern Watch, enforcing the UN-mandated no-fly zone over southern Iraq.

2000s

2000
On 26 July 2000, after successful completion of the largest crew swap in U.S. Navy history, Essex replaced  and inherited the distinctive role as the Navy's only permanently forward-deployed amphibious assault ship in United States Fleet Activities Sasebo, Japan.

2001
While in her forward-deployed role, Essex has participated in various humanitarian assistance/disaster relief operations including East Timor in October and November 2001 and Foal Eagle in Korea in 2002.

2004
Essex stayed in the Persian Gulf while the 31st MEU and the combat element 1st Battalion, 3rd Marines went into Iraq for the Battle of Fallujah. During that time, Essex went to aid in Operation Unified Assistance in Banda Aceh, Indonesia, after the December 2004 tsunami. She then returned to the Persian Gulf to embark the 31st MEU SOC and the combat element despite being in need of maintenance. After picking up the MEU and the Combat Element, the three ships returned to Okinawa, Japan. The ship had been at sea for a total of eight months.

2008
During the 2008 Myanmar Cyclone Nargis crisis and the subsequent Operation Caring Response aid mission, Essex and her amphibious group (made up of Juneau, Harpers Ferry, and the destroyer ) stood by off Burma from 13 May to 5 June, waiting for the Myanmar junta government to permit US aid to its citizens. In early June, with permission still not forthcoming, it was decided to put the group back on its scheduled operations.

2009
Early in 2009, Essex completed exercise Cobra Gold, which had been cut short the previous year. Essex followed this with exercise Balikatan with the Republic of the Philippines. Essex then got underway in support of exercise Talisman Saber 2009 and conducted various well deck and flight deck evolutions supporting this joint bilateral exercise between the U.S. and Australian military forces.

2010s

2010
In February, at the conclusion of exercise Cobra Gold 2010, Essex visited Laem Chabang in Thailand.

During 21–23 October, the Essex Expeditionary Strike Group provided humanitarian assistance and disaster relief to the Philippines after the Super Typhoon Juan (international name Megi) caused extensive destruction to municipalities along the eastern coast of the Province of Isabela. The crew was awarded the Humanitarian Service Medal.

2011
At the request for assistance from the Japanese government, the Navy directed Essex to be deployed off the northeastern coast of Honshu after the massive 2011 Tōhoku earthquake and tsunami. The ship was involved in relief activities in the Sea of Japan off Akita Prefecture. Helicopters from the ship helped deliver relief supplies to quake and tsunami survivors along the northeast coast of Tohoku.

The ship departed Sasebo in September 2011 to patrol the western Pacific.

In November, a Petty Officer 1st Class was fatally injured aboard Essex during a weapons systems test while the ship was off the coast of Bali. A command report released in early 2012 cited "breakdown of safety procedures, protocol violations and gross negligence".

2012
While Essex was scheduled to depart for Cobra Gold 2012, an annual exercise with Thailand, her participation was canceled due to maintenance issues.

It was announced in January 2012 that Essex would be returning to her former home port of San Diego, California, after 11 years of forward deployment in Japan. Before departing for San Diego, the Essex crew will perform a hull swap with the crew of fellow Wasp-class sister-ship, Bonhomme Richard, to continue their deployment to Sasebo, but aboard the newly arrived ship.

Collision with USNS Yukon
On 16 May 2012, Essex suffered an apparent steering failure while approaching  for an underway replenishment. The two ships collided, causing damage to both ships. There were no injuries, and no loss of fuel was reported. Both ships were able to continue to San Diego under their own power. On 19 June 2012 the Navy announced that the ship's commander, Captain Chuck Litchfield, had been relieved of command due to "loss of confidence in his ability to command."

An investigation determined that the collision was avoidable and caused by improper supervision by Litchfield over his junior bridge crew. Although Essexs steering had failed, the investigation determined that better leadership by Litchfield could have prevented the collision. The investigation recommended administrative action against Essexs executive officer, Officer Of the Deck (OOD), conning officer, and helm safety officer.

Essex entered Naval Base San Diego for an 18-month maintenance and upgrade on 18 September 2012.

2014
After two years of dry-dock and pier side maintenance, Essex executed an on-time underway to conduct sea trials in April 2014. Essex also received an aviation certification in May 2014 by showing proficiency in the launching, landing and refueling of various helicopters and MV-22 Ospreys on the flight deck.

2015

On 30 November 2015, Essex and her Amphibious Ready Group (ARG), embarked with the 15th MEU entered the United States Third Fleet Area of Operations (AO), returning from a deployment that spread across the 5th, 6th and 7th AOs.

2017

2018
In September 2018 the Essex ARG with the F-35B equipped Marine Fighter Attack Squadron 211 (VMFA-211) aboard deployed to the United States Central Command AO. On 27 September, it was reported that the first-ever F-35B airstrike was launched from Essex against a fixed Taliban target.

2020 COVID-19 pandemic

The coronavirus pandemic was reported to have spread to the crew of Essex when its first case was reported on 17 March. The sailor had been attending a course at Naval Base San Diego since 6 February 2020 when the test returned positive on 14 March. The student subsequently self-isolated at home.

2022

Essex participated in RIMPAC 2022.

References

Further reading

External links

 
 USS Essex (LHD-2) command histories – Naval History & Heritage Command
 
 
 
 
 
 
 
 
 
 
 

 

Wasp-class amphibious assault ships
Amphibious warfare vessels of the United States
Ships built in Pascagoula, Mississippi
1991 ships
Naval ships involved in the COVID-19 pandemic